Puya alata is a plant species in the genus Puya. This species is endemic to Bolivia.

References

alata
Flora of Bolivia